Albert the Great (foaled May 7, 1997) is an American Thoroughbred racehorse and the winner of the 2000 Jockey Club Gold Cup.

Career

Albert the Great's first race was on January 22, 2000 at Gulfstream Park, where he came in 3rd. He won his first race on April 22, 2000 at Keeneland.

His first major win came on July 9, 2000, where he won the Dwyer Stakes.

He did not win again until October 14, 2000, when he won the 2000 Jockey Club Gold Cup.

He came in 4th place in the 2000 Breeders' Cup Classic.

He picked up his next win at the Widener Handicap on March 24, 2001.

He then got a pair of victories on Summer 2001, when he won the Brooklyn Handicap and the Suburban Handicap.

He tried to win the Jockey Club Gold Cup for a second time in October 2001, but came in 4th. In his final race on October 27, 2001, he tried again to win the Breeders' Cup Classic, but came in 3rd place.

Stud career
Albert the Great's descendants include:

c = colt, f = filly

Pedigree

References

1997 racehorse births
American racehorses
Racehorses bred in Kentucky
Racehorses trained in the United States
Thoroughbred family 16-h